Graffham is a village and civil parish in West Sussex, England, situated on the northern escarpment of the South Downs.  The civil parish is made up of the village of Graffham, part of the hamlet of Selham, and South Ambersham. It forms part of the Bury Ward for the purposes of electing a Councillor to Chichester District Council.

History
Graffham was listed in the Domesday Book (1086) in the ancient hundred of Easebourne as having 13 households: seven villagers and six smallholders; with land for ploughing, woodland for pigs and a church, the parish's value to the lord of the manor was £8.

In the 1861 census, the parish covered  and had a population of 410. Selham was still a separate parish covering  with a population of 123.

Demography
In the 2001 census, the parish covered 11.81 km2 (2,917 acres) and had 229 households with a total population of 510 of whom 229 residents were economically active. The population at the 2011 Census was 516.

Amenities
The village of Graffham contains two pubs The Forester's Arms and The White Horse, a recreation ground, a village shop, the Anglican parish church of St Giles, which was largely rebuilt between 1874 and 1887, and a primary school. Seaford College, an independent school, is close by.

Notable people
Notable residents have included Jane Vigor, Harry Ricardo, David Young, Baron Young of Graffham, Sebastian Wiener  and Timothy Bell, Baron Bell.

References

External links
 Further historical information and sources on GENUKI

Villages in West Sussex
Chichester District